"Champagne Showers" is a song performed by American EDM/electro hop recording duo LMFAO, featuring vocals from English singer-songwriter Natalia Kills. It was released as the second single from the album Sorry for Party Rocking (2011). This song was an international hit in New Zealand, Australia, France, Ireland and Austria, peaking #8, #9, #12, #15 and #18 respectively. This song was also in the Australian Top 50 for 27 Weeks and in the French Top 200 for 50 weeks.

Background
The song was reportedly inspired by a post-season holiday undertaken by Australian Football League (AFL) player Jude Bolton and several of his Sydney Swans teammates to Los Angeles during the 2010 post-season.

Music video
The music video for the song was uploaded to YouTube on June 8, 2011 and is a continuation of "Party Rock Anthem", this time emulating the movie Blade, the rave bloodbath scene specifically, instead of "28 DAYS LATER".

The video's introduction is quite similar to "Party Rock Anthem". An opening caption says Redfoo and SkyBlu have become shuffling zombies and are now in search of the perfect party in downtown Transylvania From Dusk Till Dawn. Redfoo and SkyBlu exit their vehicle in an empty car park and Redfoo opens out a map on the vehicle's hood. While arguing about their next destination, the shufflers are grabbed by an eccentric looking man, who pulls them behind the personalized Kia Soul. This time, they don't take it lightly and start to hit the stranger with the map. The "beating" soon ceases and the assailant is shown in full view. He recognizes the LMFAO crew, calling them the "shuffle guys". While the duo are justifying this nickname, the stranger appears to be day-dreaming yet focusing intensely on the shufflers. He invites them to a party, and after much persistence and also the promise of shots, LMFAO decide to attend this club.

The actual song begins, the video changes to the duo entering the club, and the viewer is shown that the guests are many of the original shufflers (including the Shuffle Bot and also Quest Crew – winners of America's Best Dance Crew, season 3) who are already busy party rocking. LMFAO join the dance-floor and the video alternates between shots of the dancers and shots of Natalia Kills. However, little do Redfoo and Sky Blu know that this party is hosted by a crew of blood-suckers who feast on their guests.  This is made evident when one of the women bares her fangs and even more so when Redfoo cuts his finger while trying to open a champagne bottle – this grabs the attention of the vampires who begin to flirt with him. Natalia almost gets seduced by Redfoo, but then throws him to her vampires. The guys are oblivious to the attacking vampires and unknowingly manage to fight them off while dancing. However, they only realize the truth when the vampires form a demonic group behind them.

The next scene involves Redfoo, Sky Blu, the Shuffle Bot and Q running towards the exit. The door suddenly bursts open and Jesus of Hollywood (Kevin Lee Light) strides in wearing Beats by Dr. Dre. He presents the group with crates filled with bottles of "Holy Champagne", and they use these drinks against the vampires, creating a huge champagne shower, referring to the song name.  The music video ends with the dancers party rocking in victory and Jesus of Hollywood high-fiving the entire crew.

Critical reception
Robert Copsey of Digital Spy UK gave the track 2 out of 5 stars, saying, "During our recent interview with LMFAO", the uncle-nephew duo not only described their new single as "the ultimate party song", but insisted that it would "change the way that people view champagne".

Track listings
Digital download
 "Champagne Showers" (featuring Natalia Kills) – 4:24
 "Champagne Showers" (featuring Natalia Kills) [radio edit] – 3:58

Digital remixes
 "Champagne Showers" (featuring Natalia Kills) [Sidney Samson Remix] – 5:34
 "Champagne Showers" (featuring Natalia Kills) [Quintino Remix] – 6:00
 "Champagne Showers" (featuring Natalia Kills) [EC Twins & Remy Le Duc Remix] – 4:20
 "Champagne Showers" (featuring Natalia Kills) [Dimitri Vegas & Like Mike Tomorrowland Remix] – 4:38
 "Champagne Showers" (featuring Natalia Kills) [Final DJs Remix] – 4:36
 "Champagne Showers" (featuring Natalia Kills) [R3hab remix] – 4:48

Charts and certifications

Weekly charts

Year-end charts

Certifications

Release history

References 

LMFAO songs
Natalia Kills songs
2011 singles
Song recordings produced by GoonRock
2011 songs
Eurodance songs
Songs written by Redfoo
Songs written by Sky Blu (rapper)
Interscope Records singles
Songs about alcohol